Lucas Ramos may refer to:

 Lucas Ramos (footballer, born 1995), Lucas Ramos de Oliveira, Brazilian football midfielder
 Lucas Ramos (footballer, born 2001), Lucas de Ramos Silveira, Brazilian football midfielder
 Lucas Ramos Roggia, Brazilian football forward